Group A of UEFA Euro 2016 contained France, Romania, debutant Albania and Switzerland. France was the only former European champion in this group, having won the championship two times (in 1984 and 2000). Matches were played from 10 to 19 June 2016.

Teams

Notes

Standings

In the round of 16,
The winner of Group A, France, advanced to play the third-placed team of Group E, Republic of Ireland.
The runner-up of Group A, Switzerland, advanced to play the runner-up of Group C, Poland.

Matches

France vs Romania

Albania vs Switzerland

Romania vs Switzerland

France vs Albania

Romania vs Albania

Switzerland vs France

References

External links
UEFA Euro 2016 Group A

UEFA Euro 2016
France at UEFA Euro 2016
Romania at UEFA Euro 2016
Albania at UEFA Euro 2016
Switzerland at UEFA Euro 2016